Mertan Caner Öztürk (born 2 November 1992) is a Turkish footballer who plays as a winger for Kocaelispor.

He is currently studying German language and literature at Istanbul University.

Club career

Galatasaray

He played his first match for the club on 12 November 2011 in a friendly against S.L. Benfica. He signed a 5-year professional contract with Galatasaray on 18 November 2011, after impressing Fatih Terim in the game the week before. He is known with his talented vision, and uses his pace and technique to his advantage.

He played his first official match for the club on 10 January 2012 in a cup match against Adana Demirspor. He made an assist to Sercan Yıldırım, which turned the match to 3-0.

On 6 July 2012, Mertan Caner Öztürk was brought to the A squad by Fatih Terim and was training in the camp in Austria alongside Semih Kaya, Tomáš Ujfaluši, Milan Baroš, Fernando Muslera, and the rest of the Galatasaray squad so they could prepare for the Süper Lig, Turkish Cup and the UEFA Champions League.

References

External links
 Statistics at TFF.org 
 
 

1992 births
People from Fatih
Footballers from Istanbul
Turkish people of Circassian descent
Living people
Turkish footballers
Turkey youth international footballers
Association football midfielders
Galatasaray S.K. footballers
Altınordu F.K. players
Aydınspor footballers
Manisaspor footballers
Elazığspor footballers
Ankaraspor footballers
Boluspor footballers
İstanbulspor footballers
Kocaelispor footballers
TFF First League players
TFF Second League players